Delcourt may refer to:

People
 Frédéric Delcourt (born 1964), French backstroke swimmer and Olympic medalist
 Guillaume Delcourt (1825-1898), Belgian navy officer, navigator, naval engineer, and maritime advisor to King Leopold II.
 Guy Delcourt (politician) (born 1947), French politician
 Guy Delcourt (editor) (born 1958), French comics editor and publisher, founder of the Delcourt publishing house
 Jacques Delcourt (1928–2011), French sports administrator
 Marie Delcourt (1891–1979), Belgian philologist

Other uses
 Delcourt (publisher), French publishing house specializing in comics and manga

See also
 Delcourt's gecko, an extinct species